Impressions in Blood is the seventh studio album by Polish death metal band Vader. It was released on 23 August 2006 in Japan by Avalon Marquee with a bonus cover of "Raining Blood" by Slayer. In Poland, the album was released on 1 September 2006 via Mystic Production. The album was nominated for a Fryderyk Award in the category 'Rock/Metal Album of the Year (Album roku rock/ metal)'.

Impressions in Blood was recorded between April and June 2006 at Hertz Studio in Białystok, Poland, and was produced by the Wiesławscy Brothers. The album features cover art by Septicflesh bassist Seth Siro Anton. Dariusz "Daray" Brzozowski described the work on the album, saying:

A music video was shot for the song "Helleluyah!!! (God Is Dead)", which was directed by Andrzej Wyrozębski. Janusz Król was responsible for special effects and the set design for the video, while Sławomir Panasewicz was the cameraman. In Poland, Impressions in Blood landed at position No. 8, and dropped out five weeks later. The album also charted in Japan.

Track listing

Personnel 
Production and performance credits are adapted from the album liner notes.

Charts

Release history

References 

Vader (band) albums
2006 albums
Regain Records albums
Albums with cover art by Spiros Antoniou